The winners of the 2000 French Union of Film Critics Awards are listed below.

Winners
Best Film: La Maladie de Sachs
Best Foreign Film: Eyes Wide Shut by Stanley Kubrick
Best Short: Les Aveugles

External links
2000 French Syndicate of Cinema Critics Awards at the IMDB

French Union of Film Critics Awards
2000 film awards
2000 in French cinema